"Let Me Hold You (Turn Me On)" is a song by American DJs Cheat Codes and Dutch DJ Dante Klein. Released by Spinnin' Records on July 1, 2016, the song is largely a cover of Kevin Lyttle's 2003 hit "Turn Me On", though it does include new lyrics. It is the follow-up to Cheat Codes' internationally successful single "Sex".

Music video
The song's music video was released to the Spinnin' Records YouTube channel on June 30, 2016, and was directed by Chris Campbell.

Track listing

Charts

Weekly charts

Year-end charts

Certifications

References

2016 songs
2016 singles
Cheat Codes (DJs) songs
Spinnin' Records singles
Songs written by Daron Jones
Songs written by Slim (singer)
Songs written by Quinnes Parker
Tropical house songs